Institute of Professional Education & Research (IPER), Bhopal is a private institution situated in Bhopal, Madhya Pradesh. It was founded by Chaitanya Shiksha Samiti in 1996 and its courses are affiliated to AICTE and Barkatullah University, Bhopal.

Campus Location 
The management institute is located in Bhopal along Bhojpur Road (Bhojpur, Madhya Pradesh), about 11 km from Rani Kamalapati Railway Station. The institution has a lush green technical campus, with two multi-storeyed buildings that houses the academics department of two different courses – Undergraduate and Post Graduate programs. Additionally, both the buildings has number of necessary essentials like seminar halls, auditoriums, lecture halls, canteen, libraries, computer labs, career center offices and staff rooms .

Academics 
The undergraduate programme (BBA, BCOM – Economics, Honors, Marketing, Insurance & Foreign Trade) & Post Graduation programme (MBA) affiliated to Barkatullah University, Bhopal. The Post-Graduation programme is approved by All India Council of Technical Education (AICTE).

Courses offered 
Institute of Professional Education offers variety of courses (undergraduate & post-graduate) under the disciplines of management and commerce education –
 Master of Business Administration (MBA)
 Bachelor of Business Administration (BBA)
 Bachelor of Commerce (Economics)
 Bachelor of Commerce (Honors)
 Bachelor of Commerce (Insurance)
 Bachelor of Commerce (Advertising, Sales & Promotion)
 Bachelor of Commerce (Foreign Trade)

Admission process 
Admission to the post graduate curriculum - MBA, is done on the basis of CMAT score and as per the guidelines set by Directorate of Technical Education (DTE), Madhya Pradesh. For the undergraduate programme, the admission process is managed by the Department of Higher Education, Government of Madhya Pradesh.

Training & placement 
Major recruiters of IPER includes Nestle, Airtel, Asian Paints Ltd, Shoppers Stop, ITC Limited, Reliance Communications, Paytm, PayPal, DMart, HDB Financial Services (HDBFS), Jaro Education, Justdial.com, HDFC Bank, SBI General Insurance, Courtyard Marriott, Mahindra Finance, Redington, Colgate Palmolive, Kotak Mahindra, CapitalVia, Axis Bank.

Awards & achievements 
The Institute received an accreditation of National Board of Accreditation in 2005 and was listed among the top 100 management schools of India in the year of 2015 by OutlookIndia Magazine.

Facilities 
 Library
 Career Center
 Canteen
 Transport
 Computer Centers
 Seminar Halls
 Lecture Halls
 Auditorium

Extra-curricular activities 
 Reflexions - The Management Fest of IPER
 RISE - The Annual Fest of IPERUG
 WWF - The Market Wrestling
 NSS - The National Service Scheme
 Abhiyan - The Panel Discussion for Management Students 
 Sports - Black Panther
 Guest Lectures
 Marketing Club Activity

See also
 Barkatullah University
 Jagran Lakecity University
 Lakshmi Narain College of Technology
 Radharaman Institute Of Technology & Science
 Patel College of Science & Technology
 IES Group of Institutions
 Oriental Institute of Science and Technology

References 

Business schools in Madhya Pradesh
Universities and colleges in Bhopal
Educational institutions established in 1996
1996 establishments in Madhya Pradesh